The Venerable Samuel Barton was an Anglican priest in the  first half of the 17th  century.

Burton  was  born in Staffordshire and educated at Christ Church, Oxford. He held livings at Long Marston, Warwickshire and Stratton-on-the-Fosse, Somerset. Burton was Archdeacon of Gloucester from 1607 until his death on 14 June 1634.

Notes 

1634 deaths
Alumni of Christ Church, Oxford
Archdeacons of Gloucester
17th-century English Anglican priests
People from Staffordshire